The Hmar languages (Hmar Ṭawng) or Hmaric languages are a subbranch of the Kukish branch of the Sino-Tibetan language family which comprises Hmar proper (Khawsak), Biate, Hrangkhol, Sakachep, Zote, Darlong, Thiek, Saihriem (Faihriem) and others. The Hmar languages are often treated as dialects of a single language, since differences between them are reportedly minor. The speakers of the language are also known as Hmar. 

In Manipur, Hmar exhibits partial mutual intelligibility with the other Kukish dialects of the area including Thadou, Paite, Vaiphei, Simte, Kom and Gangte languages.

References

Languages of Assam
Languages of Manipur
Languages of Mizoram
Endangered languages of India
Languages of Tripura
Hmar